Didacticism is a philosophy that emphasizes instructional and informative qualities in literature, art, and design. In art, design, architecture, and landscape, didacticism is an emerging conceptual approach that is driven by the urgent need to explain.

When applied to ecological questions (for example), didacticism in art, design, architecture and landscape attempts to persuade the viewer of environmental priorities; thus, constituting an entirely new form of explanatory discourse that presents, what can be called "eco-lessons". This concept can be defined as "ecological didacticism".

Overview
The term has its origin in the Ancient Greek word διδακτικός (didaktikos), "pertaining to instruction", and signified learning in a fascinating and intriguing manner.

Didactic art was meant both to entertain and to instruct. Didactic plays, for instance, were intended to convey a moral theme or other rich truth to the audience. During the Middle Age, the Roman Catholic chants like the Veni Creator Spiritus, as well as the Eucharistic hymns like the Adoro te devote and Pange lingua are used for fixing within prayers the truths of the Roman Catholic faith to preserve them and pass down from a generation to another. In the Renaissance, the church began a syncretism between pagan and the Christian didactic art, a syncretism that reflected its dominating temporal power and recalled the controversy among the pagan and Christian aristocracy in the fourth century. An example of didactic writing is Alexander Pope's An Essay on Criticism (1711), which offers a range of advice about critics and criticism. An example of didactism in music is the chant Ut queant laxis, which was used by Guido of Arezzo to teach solfege syllables. 

Around the 19th century the term didactic came to also be used as a criticism for work that appears to be overburdened with instructive, factual, or otherwise educational information, to the detriment of the enjoyment of the reader (a meaning that was quite foreign to Greek thought). Edgar Allan Poe called didacticism the worst of "heresies" in his essay The Poetic Principle.

Examples
Some instances of didactic literature include:
 Instructions of Kagemni, by Kagemni I(?) (2613–2589 BC?) 
 Instruction of Hardjedef, by Hardjedef (between 25th century BC and 24th century BC) 
 The Maxims of Ptahhotep, by Ptahhotep (around 2375-2350 BC) 
 Works and Days, by Hesiod (c. 700 BC)
 On Horsemanship, by Xenophon (c. 350 BC)
 The Panchatantra, by Vishnu Sarma (c. 300 BC)
 De rerum natura, by Lucretius (c. 50 BC)
 Georgics, by Virgil (c. 30 BC)
 Ars Poetica by Horace (c. 18 BC)
 Ars Amatoria, by Ovid (1 BC)
 Thirukkural, by Thiruvalluvar (between 2nd century BC and 5th century AD)
 Remedia Amoris, by Ovid (AD 1)
 Medicamina Faciei Femineae, by Ovid (between 1 BC and AD 8)
 Astronomica by Marcus Manilius (c. AD 14)
 Epistulae morales ad Lucilium, by Seneca the Younger, (c. 65 AD)
 Cynegetica, by Nemesianus (3rd century AD)
 The Jataka Tales (Buddhist literature, 5th century AD)
 Philosophus Autodidactus by Ibn Tufail (12th century)
 Theologus Autodidactus by Ibn al-Nafis (1270s)
 The Morall Fabillis of Esope the Phrygian (1480s)
 The Puruṣaparīkṣā by Vidyapati
 The Pilgrim's Progress, by John Bunyan (1678)
 Rasselas, by Samuel Johnson (1759)
 The History of Little Goody Two-Shoes (anonymous, 1765)
 The Adventures of Nicholas Experience, by Ignacy Krasicki (1776)
 Critical and Miscellaneous Essays, by Thomas Carlyle (1838–1839)
 Critical and Historical Essays, by Thomas Babington Macaulay (1843)
 The Water-Babies, by Charles Kingsley (1863)
 Fors Clavigera, by John Ruskin (1871–1884)
 If-, by Rudyard Kipling (1910)
 Siddhartha, by Hermann Hesse (1952)
 Sophie's World, by Jostein Gaarder (1991)
 The Wizard of Gramarye series by Christopher Stasheff (1968-2004)
 Children's Books in England: Five Centuries of Social Life. by F. J. Harvey Darton

Some examples of research that investigates didacticism in art, design, architecture and landscape:

 "Du Didactisme en Architecture / On Didacticism in Architecture". (2019). In C. Cucuzzella, C. I. Hammond, S. Goubran, & C. Lalonde (Eds.), Cahiers de Recherche du LEAP (Vol. 3). Potential Architecture Books.
 Cucuzzella, C., Chupin, J.-P., & Hammond, C. (2020). "Eco-didacticism in art and architecture: Design as means for raising awareness". Cities, 102, 102728.

Some examples of art, design, architecture and landscape projects that present eco-lessons.

See also
 Art for art's sake
 Autodidactism
 John Cassell, 19th century publisher of educational magazines and books
 Children's literature
 Sebayt
 Wisdom literature

References

Further reading
 Glaisyer, Natasha and Sara Pennell. Didactic Literature in England, 1500-1800: Expertise Reconstructed. Ashgate Publishing, Ltd., 2003.
 Journal of Thought. United States, Journal of Thought Fund, 2002.
 Wittig, Claudia. Prodesse et Delectare: Case Studies on Didactic Literature in the European Middle Ages / Fallstudien Zur Didaktischen Literatur Des Europäischen Mittelalters''. Germany, De Gruyter, 2019.

External links 
 
 

Literary concepts
Didactics
Theories of aesthetics